The 2014 Outback Bowl was an American college football bowl game that was played on January 1, 2014, at Raymond James Stadium in Tampa, Florida.  The 28th edition of the Outback Bowl (which was originally called the Hall of Fame Bowl, and later renamed via sponsorship from Outback Steakhouse), it featured the LSU Tigers from the Southeastern Conference (SEC) and the Iowa Hawkeyes from the Big Ten Conference.  It was one of the 2013–14 bowl games that concluded the 2013 FBS football season.  The game started at 1:00 p.m. EST and was telecast on ESPN. LSU defeated Iowa by a score of 21–14.

Teams
Iowa had won the only previous meeting between the two teams, in the 2005 Capital One Bowl.

Iowa

Iowa had a record of 8–4 (5–3 Big Ten). Unranked, they finished the season second place in the Big Ten Legends Division.

LSU

LSU had a regular season record of 9–3 (5–3 SEC). Ranked #16 in the BCS, they finished in third place in the Southeast Conference Western Division.

Game summary

Statistics

References

ReliaQuest Bowl
Outback Bowl
Outback Bowl
Iowa Hawkeyes football bowl games
LSU Tigers football bowl games
21st century in Tampa, Florida
Outback Bowl